The Ordinariate for Byzantine-Rite Catholics in Austria (or Ordinariate of Austria of the Eastern Rite) is a Catholic Ordinariate for Eastern Catholic faithful jointly for all Eastern Catholics of Byzantine Rite in the various languages of particular churches sui iuris in Austria.

It is immediately exempt to the Holy See and its Dicastery for the Eastern Churches.

History 

The Greek Catholic Churches were present in the Austrian Empire since November 21, 1611 when the Serbian Orthodox Bishop Simeon Vratanja of Marča traveled to Rome and formally accepted the jurisdiction of the pope over his bishopric, which eventually became the Eparchy of Križevci in 1777. As a result of the incorporation of Ukrainian territories into the Empire, in 1783 the first Ukrainian Greek-Catholic parish (called then Ruthenian) of St. Barbara in Vienna (Barbarakirche), approved by Emperor Joseph II of Austria, was founded.

With the Republic of Austria, the 1933 Holy See's Concordat was the legal basis.

In the course of the Cold War, when the Eastern Churches were in distress, in 1956 the Ordinariat was established as a diocese of the Austrian faithful. It is exempt, directly subordinate to the Holy See, and is personally headed by the Archbishop of Vienna. Until the 1980s, several other missions were created next to St. Barbara.

On December 12, 1935 a decree of the Congregation for the Oriental Churches decided that the parish of Santa Barbara in Vienna was transferred from the archieparchy of Lviv to the jurisdiction of the Archbishop of Vienna in a personal capacity as apostolic delegate (delegatus tamquam Sanctae Sedis specialiter), meaning that it was not included in the archdiocese of Vienna. The same decree arranged that all the Byzantine Catholic faithful of Austria should pass into the personal jurisdiction of the archbishop: In erga fideles rite commorantes Byzantini fines intra Reipublicae Austriacae.

Another decree of October 3, 1945, decided to extend the jurisdiction of the archbishop (facultates omnes) and on November 1, 1945 he was appointed vicar general of the Byzantine Catholics in Austria.

The ordinariate was established on 13 June 1956, on territory previously only served pastorally by the Latin church. It is vested in the Archbishop of Vienna, once capital of the Habsburg monarchy, which included many of the present Eastern (European) 'Greek' Catholic communities.

Territory and statistics 

The diocese extends to all the faithful who live in Austria and belong to the Byzantine Rite. Its episcopal see is the St. Barbara church, in Vienna (Wien), capital of Austria.

There are larger Ukrainian and Romanian communities and smaller Melkite, Byzantine groups of Italo-Albanians, Ruthenians, Greeks, Bulgarians, Slovaks and Hungarians.

The ordinary is regularly the archbishop of Vienna, who entrusts his administration to a vicar general protosyncellus based in Vienna, who since 2014 is Yurij Kolasa. The Romanian Mission (Misiunii Romane Unite din Vienna) has a rector, Vasile Lutai.

As per 2016, it pastorally served 10,000 Catholics in 1 parish and 8 missions.

Parish and chapels

Ukrainian Greek Catholic Church 

The Ukrainian Greek Catholic
central parish is in the church of Santa Barbara in Vienna, which is the only parish of the Ordinariate (central parish), together with three other Byzantine chapels in Lower Austria.

Except in Vienna are currently Ukrainian Greek Catholic chapels in Salzburg (St. Mark's Church) Innsbruck (auxiliary funeral parish at the international seminary Collegium Canisianum) Graz (Mary Help of Christians Church) and Linz (Carmelite Church).

The first congregation in present-day Austria was founded in Vienna in 1783, when Galicia and Lodomeria became part of the Habsburg monarchy during the Polish partition and Ukrainians, also called Ruthenians increasingly came to the capital of the empire. As early as 1773, Maria Theresa had handed over the repealed Viennese Jesuit convent as barbarous to the Greek Catholic.

After the end of the Second World War, the number of Ukrainian Greek Catholic faithful in Austria increased again significantly. The newcomers mostly migrated to North America and Australia. In the 1990s, Ukrainian Catholic war refugees from Bosnia Herzegovina, mostly from the Republika Srpska, fled to Austria, and more emigrations from Ukraine and Poland took place, which in turn increased the number of believers.

Romanian Greek Catholic Church 

The Romanian Greek Catholic
mission is based in the Saint Roch Chapel in Vienna also using the church of St. George in Kagran. Other communities exist in Graz, Linz, Murau and Wiener Neustadt.

There was also a community in Salzburg, which was dissolved in the 1950s.

Melkite Greek Catholic Church 

The Melkite Greek Catholic community is based at Saint Jacob in Vienna.

German-speaking Catholic Byzantine communities 

There are also German-speaking Catholic Byzantine communities that meet in the church of Santa Barbara in Vienna (where there is a Hungarian Byzantine priest and another Ruthenian) and in Salzburg.

In the decade of 1950 a small Russian Byzantine Catholic community existed in Salzburg, but it disappeared after the death of its priest.

List of parishes with churches, chapels and pastoral offices

Episcopal ordinaries

(all Roman Rite)

Ordinaries of Austria of Eastern Rite
 Franz König (1956.06.13 – 1985.09.16), Metropolitan Archbishop of Wien (1956.05.10 – retired 1985.09.16), concurrently President of Episcopal Conference of Austria (1958 – 1985), created Cardinal-Priest of S. Eusebio (1958.12.18 – 2004.03.13), Military Vicar of Austria (1959.02.21 – 1969.05.07), President of Secretariat for Non-Believers in the Roman Curia (1965.04.06 – 1980.06.27); previously Titular Bishop of Livias (1952.07.03 – 1956.05.10) as (non-succeeding) Coadjutor Bishop of Sankt Pölten (Austria) (1952.07.03 – 1956.05.10); later became Protopriest of College of Cardinals (1991.11.13 – 2004.03.13)
 Hans Hermann Groër, Benedictine Congregation of Austria of the Immaculate Conception (O.S.B.) (1987.02.21 – retirement 1995.09.14), Metropolitan Archbishop of Wien (Austria) (1986.07.15 – retired 1995.09.14), President of Episcopal Conference of Austria (1988 – 1995), created Cardinal-Priest of Ss. Gioacchino ed Anna al Tuscolano (1988.06.28 – death 2003.03.24)
 Christoph Schönborn, Dominican Order (O.P.) (1995.11.06 – ...), Metropolitan Archbishop of Wien (Vienna) (1995.09.14 – ...), created Cardinal-Priest of Gesù Divin Lavoratore (1998.02.21 [1998.11.22] – ...), President of Episcopal Conference of Austria (1998.06.30 – ...), Member of Commission of Cardinals overseeing the Institute for Works of Religion (2014.01.15 – ...); previously Titular Bishop of Sutri (1991.07.11 – 1995.04.13) as Auxiliary Bishop of Wien (1991.07.11 – 1995.04.13), promoted (succeeding) Coadjutor Archbishop of Wien (1995.04.13 – 1995.09.14).

See also 
 List of Catholic dioceses in Austria
 Catholic Church in Austria
 List of Jesuit sites

References

Sources and external links
 erzdioezese-wien.at
 Gcatholic, with Google map and satellite photo - data for all sections
 Catholic-hierarchy.org
 ukrainische-kirche.at
 Website of St. Barbara Church in Wien (st-barbara-austria.org)
 kath.net 
 Byzantine Ordinariate of Austria st-barbara-austria.org
 Byzantine Ordinariate in Austria  ruk-wien.at
 Struktur der Seelsorge für die ukrainische griechisch-katholischen Gläubigen ukrainische-kirche-innsbruck.at
 kath.net

Ordinariates for Eastern Catholic faithful
Eastern Catholic dioceses
Eastern Catholic dioceses in Europe
Roman Catholic dioceses in Austria
Innere Stadt
Eastern Catholicism in Austria